In music, solfège or solfeggio, also called sol-fa, solfa, solfeo, among many names, is a music education method used to teach aural skills, pitch and sight-reading of Western music. Solfège is a form of solmization, though the two terms are sometimes used interchangeably.

Syllables are assigned to the notes of the scale and enable the musician to audiate, or mentally hear, the pitches of a piece of music being seen for the first time and then to sing them aloud. Through the Renaissance (and much later in some shapenote publications) various interlocking 4, 5 and 6-note systems were employed to cover the octave. The tonic sol-fa method popularized the seven syllables commonly used in English-speaking countries: do (or doh in tonic sol-fa), re, mi, fa, so(l), la, and ti (or si) (see below).

There are two current ways of applying solfège: 1) fixed do, where the syllables are always tied to specific pitches (e.g. "do" is always "C-natural") and 2) movable do, where the syllables are assigned to scale degrees, with "do" always the first degree of the major scale.

Etymology
Italian "solfeggio" and English/French "solfège" derive from the names of two of the syllables used: sol and fa.

The generic term "solmization", referring to any system of denoting pitches of a musical scale by syllables, including those used in India and Japan as well as solfège, comes from French solmisation, from the Latin solfège syllables sol and mi.

The verb "to sol-fa" means to sing a passage in solfège.

Origin
In eleventh-century Italy, the music theorist Guido of Arezzo invented a notational system that named the six notes of the hexachord after the first syllable of each line of the Latin hymn "Ut queant laxis", the "Hymn to St. John the Baptist", yielding ut, re, mi, fa, sol, la. Each successive line of this hymn begins on the next scale degree, so each note's name was the syllable sung at that pitch in this hymn.

Ut queant laxīs    resonāre fibrīs
Mīra gestōrum    famulī tuōrum,
Solve pollūtī    labiī reātum,
Sancte Iohannēs.

The words were written by Paulus Diaconus in the 8th century. They translate as:

So that your servants may, with loosened voices,
Resound the wonders of your deeds,
Clean the guilt from our stained lips,
O St. John.

"Ut" was changed in the 1600s in Italy to the open syllable Do, at the suggestion of the musicologist Giovanni Battista Doni (based on the first syllable of his surname), and Si (from the initials for "Sancte Iohannes") was added to complete the diatonic scale. In Anglophone countries, "si" was changed to "ti" by Sarah Glover in the nineteenth century so that every syllable might begin with a different letter (also freeing Si for later use as Sol-sharp). “Ti" is used in tonic sol-fa (and in the famed American show tune "Do-Re-Mi").

A discredited 17th-century speculation suggested that the solfège syllables (do, re, mi, fa, sol, la, ti) might derive from the syllables of an Arabic solmization system درر مفصّلات Durar Mufaṣṣalāt ("Detailed Pearls") ([[Arabic alphabet|dāl, rā', mīm, fā', ṣād, lām, tā]]), mentioned in the works of Francisci a Mesgnien Meninski in 1680 and later discussed by Jean-Benjamin de La Borde in 1780.Essai sur la Musique Ancienne et Moderne (1780)  No documentary evidence for this idea has ever been found.

In Elizabethan England

In the Elizabethan era, England and its related territories used only four of the syllables: mi, fa, sol, and la. "Mi" stood for modern si, "fa" for modern do or ut, "sol" for modern re, and "la" for modern mi. Then, fa, sol and la would be repeated to also stand for their modern counterparts, resulting in the scale being "fa, sol, la, fa, sol, la, mi, fa". The use of "fa", "sol" and "la" for two positions in the scale is a leftover from the Guidonian system of so-called "mutations" (i.e. changes of hexachord on a note, see Guidonian hand). This system was largely eliminated by the 19th century, but is still used in some shape note systems, which give each of the four syllables "fa", "sol", "la", and "mi" a different shape.

An example of this type of solmization occurs in Shakespeare's King Lear, where in Act 1, Scene 2, Edmund exclaims to himself right after Edgar's entrance so that Edgar can hear him: "O, these eclipses do portend these divisions". Then, in the 1623 First Folio (but not in the 1608 Quarto), he adds "Fa, so, la, mi". This Edmund probably sang (see ) to the tune of Fa, So, La, Ti (e.g. F, G, A, B in C major), i.e. an ascending sequence of three whole tones with an ominous feel to it: see tritone (historical uses).

Modern use
Solfège is still used for sight reading training. There are two main types: Movable do and Fixed do.

Movable do solfège
In Movable do or tonic sol-fa, each syllable corresponds to a scale degree. This is analogous to the Guidonian practice of giving each degree of the hexachord a solfège name, and is mostly used in Germanic countries, Commonwealth countries, and the United States.

One particularly important variant of movable do, but differing in some respects from the system described below, was invented in the nineteenth century by Sarah Ann Glover, and is known as tonic sol-fa.

In Italy, in 1972, Roberto Goitre wrote the famous method "Cantar leggendo", which has come to be used for choruses and for music for young children.

The pedagogical advantage of the movable-Do system is its ability to assist in the theoretical understanding of music; because a tonic is established and then sung in comparison to, the student infers melodic and chordal implications through his or her singing. Thus, while fixed-do is more applicable to instrumentalists, movable-do is more applicable to theorists and, arguably, composers.

Major
Movable do is frequently employed in Australia, China, Japan (with 5th being so, and 7th being si), Ireland, the United Kingdom, the United States, Hong Kong, and English-speaking Canada. The movable do system is a fundamental element of the Kodály method used primarily in Hungary, but with a dedicated following worldwide. In the movable do system, each solfège syllable corresponds not to a pitch, but to a scale degree: The first degree of a major scale is always sung as "do", the second as "re", etc. (For minor keys, see below.) In movable do, a given tune is therefore always sol-faed on the same syllables, no matter what key it is in.

The solfège syllables used for movable do differ slightly from those used for fixed do, because the English variant of the basic syllables ("ti" instead of "si") is usually used, and chromatically altered syllables are usually included as well.

If, at a certain point, the key of a piece modulates, then it is necessary to change the solfège syllables at that point. For example, if a piece begins in C major, then C is initially sung on "do", D on "re", etc. If, however, the piece then modulates to G major, then G is sung on "do", A on "re", etc., and C is then sung on "fa".

Minor
Passages in a minor key may be sol-faed in one of two ways in movable do: either starting on do (using "me", "le", and "te" for the lowered third, sixth, and seventh degrees, and "la" and "ti" for the raised sixth and seventh degrees), which is referred to as "do-based minor", or starting on la (using "fi" and "si" for the raised sixth and seventh degrees). The latter (referred to as "la-based minor") is sometimes preferred in choral singing, especially with children.

The choice of which system is used for minor makes a difference as to how you handle modulations. In the first case ("do-based minor"), when the key moves for example from C major to C minor the syllable do keeps pointing to the same note, namely C, (there's no "mutation" of do's note), but when the key shifts from C major to A minor (or A major), the scale is transposed from do = C to do = A. In the second case ("la-based minor"), when the key moves from C major to A minor the syllable do continues to point to the same note, again C, but when the key moves from C major to C minor the scale is transposed from do = C to do = E-flat.

Fixed do solfège

In Fixed do, each syllable corresponds to the name of a note. This is analogous to the Romance system naming pitches after the solfège syllables, and is used in Romance and Slavic countries, among others, including Spanish-speaking countries.

In the major Romance and Slavic languages, the syllables Do, Re, Mi, Fa, Sol, La, and
Si are used to name notes the same way that the letters C, D, E, F, G, A, and B are used to name notes in English. For native speakers of these languages, solfège is simply singing the names of the notes, omitting any modifiers such as "sharp" or "flat" to preserve the rhythm. This system is called fixed do''' and is used in Belgium, Brazil, Spain, Portugal, France, Italy, Romania, Latin American countries and in French-speaking Canada as well as countries such as Russia, Ukraine, and Bulgaria where non-Romance languages are spoken. In the United States, the fixed-do system is principally taught at The Juilliard School in New York City, the Curtis Institute of Music in Philadelphia, the Eastman School of Music in Rochester, New York,  and the Cleveland Institute of Music in Cleveland, Ohio.

In the fixed do system, shown above, accidentals do not affect the syllables used.

Chromatic variants
Several chromatic fixed-do Systems that have also been devised to account for chromatic notes, and even for double-sharp and double-flat variants. The Yehnian being the first 24-EDO solfège, proposed even quartertonal syllables while having no exceptions of its rules, and usability for both Si and Ti users.

 Comparison of the two systems 

Movable Do corresponds to our psychological experience of normal tunes.  If the song is sung a tone higher it is still perceived to be the same song, and the notes have the same relationship to each other, but in a fixed Do all the note names would be different. A movable Do emphasizes the musicality of the tune as the psychological perception of the notes is always relative to a key for the vast majority of people that do not have absolute pitch.

Sotorrio argues that fixed-do is preferable for serious musicians, as music involving complex modulations and vague tonality is often too ambiguous with regard to key for any movable system. That is, without a prior analysis of the music, any movable-do system would inevitably need to be used like a fixed-do system anyway, thus causing confusion. With fixed-do, the musician learns to regard any syllable as the tonic, which does not force them to make an analysis as to which note is the tonic when ambiguity occurs. Instead, with fixed-do the musician will already be practiced in thinking in multiple/undetermined tonalities using the corresponding syllables.

In comparison to the movable do system, which draws on short-term relative pitch skills involving comparison to a pitch identified as the tonic of the particular piece being performed, fixed do develops long-term relative pitch skills involving comparison to a pitch defined independently of its role in the piece, a practice closer to the definition of each note in absolute terms as found in absolute pitch.  The question of which system to use is a controversial subject among music educators in schools in the United States. While movable do is easier to teach and learn, some feel that fixed do leads to stronger sight-reading and better ear training because students learn the relationships between specific pitches as defined independently, rather than only the function of intervals within melodic lines, chords, and chord progressions.

If a performer has been trained using fixed do, particularly in those rare cases in which the performer has absolute pitch or well-developed long-term relative pitch, the performer may have difficulty playing music scored for transposing instruments: Because the "concert pitch" note to be performed differs from the note written in the sheet music, the performer may experience cognitive dissonance when having to read one note and play another. Especially in the early stages of learning a piece, when the performer has yet to gain familiarity with the melodic line of the piece as expressed in relative terms, it may be necessary to mentally re-transpose the sheet music to restore the notes to concert pitch. However, because fixed do pedagogical system often include instruction on reading all seven clefs, musicians reading transposing instruments are used to mentally substituting a clef. For example, when reading clarinets in B-flat written in treble clef, those trained in fixed do mentally substitute tenor clef. In comparison, those trained in moveable do may experience confusion in reading transposing instruments in context in a score, as it is necessary to ascertain the absolute sounding pitch coming out of the instrument to know the function of the pitch in the key that the ensemble is playing in. This is especially true for French horn parts, which are traditionally written without a key signature, and instead have all accidentals notated. A musician fluent in fixed do reading the parts in mezzo-soprano clef can ascertain the absolute pitches and use those to extrapolate function.

Those trained in fixed-do will argue that their act is the analogue of reading aloud in a language. Just as one reads this very sentence without parsing it grammatically, so too fixed-do is the direct sounding of the music. Where the movable-do system requires constant real-time analysis of the tonality and modulations in the score, in fixed-do the musician uses knowledge of the changing tonality to understand for example that the pitch class c-natural is the supertonic in B-Flat major or minor, and the dominant when the music modulates to F-major, but the c-note remains the same pitch.

Instrumentalists who begin sight-singing for the first time in college as music majors find movable do to be the system more consistent with the way they learned to read music.

For choirs, sight-singing fixed do using chromatic movable do syllables is more suitable than sight-singing movable do for reading atonal music, polytonal music, pandiatonic music, music that modulates or changes key often, or music in which the composer simply did not write a key signature. It is not uncommon for this to be the case in modern or contemporary choral works.

Note names
In the countries with fixed-do, these seven syllables (with Si replacing Ti) – rather than the letters C, D, E, F, G, A, and B – are used to name the notes of the C-Major scale. Here it would be said, for example, that Beethoven's Ninth Symphony (in D minor) is in "Re minor", and that its third movement (in B-flat major) is in "Si-bemol major".

In Germanic countries, on the other hand, it is the letters that are used for this purpose (so that Beethoven's Ninth Symphony is said to be in "d-Moll") and the solfège syllables are encountered only in their use in sight-singing and ear training.

 Other possibilities to denote solfège 

Rainbow colours assigned by Isaac Newton
Isaac Newton had associated the seven solfège syllables with the seven colours of the rainbow and surmised that each colour vibrated accordingly (a concept possibly related to the modern view of chromesthesia). Thus, red has the least amount of vibration while violet vibrates the most.

Cultural references
 The various possibilities to distinguish the notes acoustically, optically and by ways of speech and signs, made the solfège a possible syllabary for an International Auxiliary Language (IAL/LAI). This was, in the latter half of the 19th century, realised in the musical language Solresol.
 In The Sound of Music'', the song "Do-Re-Mi" is built around solfège.  Maria sings it with the von Trapp children to teach them to sing the major scale.
 Ernie Kovacs' television show had a popular recurring sketch that became known as "The Nairobi Trio". The three characters wore long overcoats, bowler hats, and gorilla masks, and were performed by Ernie and two other rotating persons including uncredited stars such as Frank Sinatra and Jack Lemmon, as well as Kovacs' wife, singer Edie Adams. There was no dialog, the three pantomimed to the song Solfeggio by Robert Maxwell and the lyrics of the song were made up solely of the solfeggio syllables themselves. The sketch was so popular, that the song was re-released as "Song of the Nairobi Trio".

See also

References

External links

 History of Notation
 Music theory online: staffs, clefs & pitch notation
 GNU Solfège, a free software program to study solfeggio
 Eyes and Ears, an anthology of melodies for practicing sight-singing
 An interactive database of sight-reading materials
 Colours are sounds: How to See the Music
 Solfeggio Frequencies

Musical notation
Constructed languages